The field hockey tournament at the 1936 Summer Olympics was the fifth edition of the field hockey event at the Summer Olympics.

All games took place either in the Hockey Stadion or on the Hockey Stadion Field No.2. Both of the field hockey grounds were near the Olympic Stadium located on the Reichssportfeld. The competition was held from 4 August 1936 to 15 August 1936. The field hockey matches saw a total attendance of 184,103 and 157,531 tickets were sold. The Indian team scored 38 goals, but only 1 goal was scored against them. British India were the Gold medalists.

Only a men's competition occurred that year.

Medal summary

Note: The International Olympic Committee medal database shows also only these players as medalists. They all played at least one match during the tournament. The reserve players are not listed as medalists.

Squads

Results

Group stage

Group A

Group B

Group C

Classification round

Medal round

Semi-finals

Bronze medal match

Gold medal match

The final was originally scheduled also on 14 August, just after the bronze medal match. But due to incessant rain, the ground was unplayable and the match was postponed to the following morning.

Participating nations
Each country was allowed to enter a team of 22 players and they all were eligible for participation. A total number of 214 field hockey players were entered.

A total of 161(*) field hockey players from 11 nations competed at the Berlin Games:

 
 
 
 
 
 
 
 
 
 
 

(*) NOTE: There are only players counted, which participated in one game at least. The consolation rounds did not count.

There are only a few reserve players known. Five players from Belgium, three players from Denmark, and two players from Japan only competed in the consolation rounds, but not all their names are known.

Final standings

Source:

References

External links
 Olympic Report
 

 
Field hockey at the Summer Olympics
1936 Summer Olympics events
1936
Summer Olympics